Boris and Gleb (Borisŭ i Glěbŭ; , Boris i Gleb; , Borys i Hlib), Christian names Roman and David, respectively (Romanŭ, Davydŭ),  were the first saints canonized in Kievan Rus' after the Christianization of the country. Their feast day is observed on July 24 (August 6).

History

According to the two 11th-century Lives of Boris and Gleb (ascribed to Nestor the Chronicler and Jacob the Monk), they were younger children of Vladimir the Great, who favored them over his other children. The Primary Chronicle claims that their mother was a Bulgarian woman. Most modern scholars, however, argue that Boris and Gleb had different mothers and were of different ages. Boris, the elder, who was already married and ruled the town of Rostov, was probably regarded as heir apparent to the Kievan throne. Gleb, who was still a minor, ruled the easternmost town of Murom.

Both brothers were murdered during the internecine wars of 1015–1019. The Primary Chronicle blames Sviatopolk the Accursed for plotting their assassinations. Boris learns of his father's death upon his return with the Rus' army to Alta. Informed of Sviatopolk's accession to the throne and urged to replace him, Boris replies: "Be it not for me to raise my hand against my elder brother. Now that my father has passed away, let him take the place of my father in my heart." Despite Boris' acquiescence, Sviatopolk sends Putsha and the boyars of Vyshegorod to execute his brother. Boris and his manservant are stabbed to death while asleep in a tent. The prince is discovered still breathing in a bodybag being transported to Kiev, but the Varangians end his life with the thrust of a sword.

Sent for by Sviatopolk, Gleb believes his father is still alive and rushes to his father's deathbed. On the way, their brother Yaroslav learns of Sviatopolk's treachery and urges Gleb not to meet him. In the middle of praying to his deceased brother and God, Gleb is assassinated by his own cook, Torchin, who cuts his throat with a kitchen knife.

The Life contains many picturesque details of Boris and Gleb's last hours, such as their sister's warning about the murderous plans of Sviatopolk. The narrative is a masterpiece of hagiography that weaves together numerous literary traditions. The factual circumstances of Boris and Gleb's lives and deaths cannot, however, be extrapolated from their hagiography. Perhaps the crucial evidence comes from several unbiased foreign sources, which mention that Boris succeeded his father in Kyiv and was not lurking in Rostov as the Russian Primary Chronicle seems to imply.

The Norse Eymund's saga relates a tale of the Varangian warriors who were hired by Yaroslav I the Wise to kill his brother Burizleif. Some historians trust the saga more than sources from Rus', claiming that it was Yaroslav and not Sviatopolk who was interested in removing his political rivals and was guilty of his brothers' murder. Others consider "Burizleif" a misreading of Bolesław, the Polish ruler allied to Sviatopolk.

Veneration
Boris and Gleb received the crown of martyrdom in 1015. The brothers became known as "Strastoterptsy" (Passion-Bearers), since they did not resist evil with violence. 
Boris and Gleb's relics were housed in the Church of St. Basil in Vyshhorod, later destroyed.
Boris and Gleb were glorified (canonized) by the Orthodox church in Rus' in 1071. The Catholic Church canonized the brothers in 1724, during the papacy of Benedict XIII. They were interred at the Vyshhorod Cathedral, which was reconsecrated in their name; many other Ukrainian and Russian churches were later named after them.

In 2011 a monument to Boris and Gleb was erected in Vyshhorod, Ukraine. The authors of the monument are Boris Krylov and Oles Sydoruk.

Feast Day 

 2 May – translation of relics (1115), (with: Boris I of Bulgaria),
 20 May – translation of relics (1024 and 1072),
 15 July – main commemoration, Boris martyrdom date,
 5 September – commemoration of Gleb martyrdom date,

Fixed Feast Day (Synaxes) 

 23 May – Synaxis of All Saints of Rostov and Yaroslavl,
 23 June – Synaxis of All Saints of Vladimir,
 10 July – Synaxis of All Saints of Ryazan (ROC),
 15 July – Synaxis of All Saints of Kiev (ROC),
 22 September – Synaxis of All Saints of Tula,
 22 September – Synaxis of All Saints of Poltava [Ukrainian Orthodox Church (Moscow Patriarchate)],

Moveable Feast Day (Synaxes) 

 Synaxis of All Saints of Smolensk – movable holiday on the Sunday before July 28th.

Gallery

Notes

External links

  Critical examination of Boris and Gleb's story
  Princes Boris and Gleb: Proto-martyrs and Passion-Bearers of Old Russia
 Nestor: The Martyrdom of Boris and Gleb
Martyrs and Passion-Bearers Boris and Gleb Orthodox icon and synaxarion for July 24
Translation of the relics of the Holy Passionbearer Boris and Gleb May 2
"The Transfer of the Relics of the Holy Passion-Bearers, Princes of Russia Boris and Gleb, -- in Holy Baptism Roman and David", St. Luke the Evangelist Orthodox Church

10th-century births
1010s deaths
11th-century Christian martyrs
11th-century Christian saints
11th-century princes in Kievan Rus'
Rurik dynasty
Murdered royalty
Murdered Russian royalty
Passion bearers
Russian saints
Ukrainian saints
Children of Vladimir the Great
Sibling duos
Russian people of Bulgarian descent